Ambia yamanakai is a moth in the family Crambidae. It was described by Valentina A. Kirpichnikova in 1999. It is found in the Russian Far East.

References

Moths described in 1999
Musotiminae
Moths of Asia